The 2023 North Indian Ocean cyclone season is an ongoing event in the annual cycle of tropical cyclone formation. The North Indian Ocean cyclone season has no official bounds, but cyclones tend to form between April and December, with the peak from May to November. These dates conventionally delimit the period of each year when most tropical cyclones form in the northern Indian Ocean.

The scope of this article is limited to the Indian Ocean in the Northern Hemisphere, east of the Horn of Africa and west of the Malay Peninsula. There are two main seas in the North Indian Ocean — the Arabian Sea to the west of the Indian subcontinent, abbreviated ARB by the India Meteorological Department (IMD); and the Bay of Bengal to the east, abbreviated BOB by the IMD.

The official Regional Specialized Meteorological Centre in this basin is the India Meteorological Department (IMD), while the Joint Typhoon Warning Center releases unofficial advisories for interest. On average, three to four cyclonic storms form in this basin every season.


Season summary

Nearing the end of January, a tropical depression classified as BOB 01 formed, becoming the first storm in the basin. The storm's formation makes it the first time since 2019 to see a storm develop in the month of January in the basin.

Systems

Depression BOB 01

 The IMD noted the system for having a moderate chance for development, which was later switched to high. The JTWC gave it a medium chance for development. The IMD later upgraded the system to Depression status and designated it as BOB 01. This was the first January system in the basin since Tropical Storm Pabuk (2019).  The JTWC later issued a Tropical Cyclone Formation Alert (TCFA) for the system. However, increasing land interaction with Sri Lanka prompted the JTWC to downgrade the system's chance for development to medium, and subsequently cancelling its TCFA.

Storm names
The names were selected by a new list from the Regional Specialized Meteorological Center in New Delhi by mid year of 2020. There is no retirement of tropical cyclone names in this basin as the list of names is only scheduled to be used once before a new list of names is drawn up. Should a named tropical cyclone move into the basin from the Western Pacific, then it will retain its original name. The next eight available names from the List of North Indian Ocean storm names are below.

Season effects
This is a table of all storms in the 2023 North Indian Ocean cyclone season. It mentions all of the season's storms and their names, duration, peak intensities according to the IMD storm scale, damage, and death totals. Damage and death totals include the damage and deaths caused when that storm was a precursor wave or extratropical low. All of the damage figures are in 2023 USD.

|-
| BOB 01 ||  || bgcolor=#| || bgcolor=#| || bgcolor=#| || Sri Lanka ||  None ||  || 
|-

See also 

 Weather of 2023
 Tropical cyclones in 2023
 North Indian Ocean cyclone season
 2023 Atlantic hurricane season
 2023 Pacific hurricane season
 2023 Pacific typhoon season
 South-West Indian Ocean cyclone seasons: 2022–23, 2023-24
 Australian region cyclone seasons: 2022-23, 2023–24
 South Pacific cyclone seasons: 2022–23, 2023–24

References

External links

RSMC New Delhi
Indian Meteorological Department
Joint Typhoon Warning Center (JTWC)
National Meteorological Center of CMA 

 
2023 meteorology
2023 NIO
North Indian Ocean cyclone seasons